Justin Cooper (born November 17, 1988) is an American former child actor. He appeared in the Domino's Pizza commercial. After two years on the daytime drama General Hospital, he starred in the film Liar Liar and the sitcom Brother's Keeper. He serves as an executive producer of The Ben Maller Show.

Filmography

External links

1988 births
Living people
20th-century American male actors
21st-century American male actors
American male child actors
American male film actors
American male television actors
Male actors from Los Angeles